The Cherry Orchard is a 1999 period drama film directed and written by Michael Cacoyannis and starring Charlotte Rampling, Alan Bates, Katrin Cartlidge, and Owen Teale. The supporting cast includes Xander Berkeley, Gerard Butler, Melanie Lynskey, and Frances de la Tour. It is based on the 1904 play The Cherry Orchard by Anton Chekhov, and was an English-language co-production between Cyprus, France and Germany.

Plot 
Abandoned by her lover, aristocrat Madame Lyubov, Ranyevskaya returns to Russia, only to see its fragrant cherry orchard in full bloom.

Main cast
 Charlotte Rampling - Madame Lyubov Andreievna Ranyevskaya
 Alan Bates - Leonid Andreievitch Gayev
 Owen Teale - Yermolai Alexeievitch Lopakhin
 Katrin Cartlidge - Varya
 Tushka Bergen - Anya
 Xander Berkeley - Yepikhodov
 Gerard Butler - Yasha
 Andrew Howard - Peter Trofimov
 Melanie Lynskey - Dunyasha
 Ian McNeice - Boris Borisovich Simeonov-Pishchik
 Frances de la Tour - Charlotta Ivanovna
 Michael Gough - Feers

References

External links
 
 

1999 films
English-language French films
English-language German films
Films based on plays by Anton Chekhov
Films directed by Michael Cacoyannis
1999 drama films
Films shot in Bulgaria
French drama films
German drama films
Cypriot drama films
1990s English-language films
1990s French films
1990s German films